USS Montgomery was a three-masted, wooden-hulled sailing frigate and one of the first 13 ships authorized by the Continental Congress on 13 December 1775. She was built by Lancaster Burling at Poughkeepsie, N.Y.; launched late in October 1776; but, because of the British capture of New York City during the Battle of Brooklyn and the closing of the Hudson River, was never completely finished and was later destroyed.
Probably build to Joshua Humphreys's standard design for the 24-gun frigates for a vessel 120' 6" (g.d) x 32' 6" x 10' 6" (h) mounting 24 x 9-pounder guns.

History
The Montgomery was named in honor of fallen general Richard Montgomery who at the commencement of the American Revolution was a British soldier who had sided with the Americans, later commissioned brigadier general by George Washington in the fall of 1775. Montgomery was later killed by British artillery during the failed assault on Quebec, 31 December 1775. To prevent its capture and use by the British the frigate was burned on 6 October 1777.

See also

 List of sailing frigates of the United States Navy

Bibliography

References

Ships of the Continental Navy
Sailing frigates of the United States Navy
1776 ships
Captured ships
Maritime incidents in 1777